The Pavilion is a house on Barge Walk in Hampton Court Park near Hampton Court Palace. It is Grade II* listed on the National Heritage List for England. It is the sole survivor of four pavilions for the Bowling Green at Hampton Court.

It was designed by William Talman under the direction of Christopher Wren as part of William III's improvements to the palace. The house is set in 2.3 acres of gardens that include a parterre and water features.

The remaining 143-year lease of the Pavilion from the Crown Estate was for sale for £6.5 million in 2007. The Pavilion was again for sale in 2012; priced at £10 million.

The pavilion was occupied by Cecil Harmsworth King and his second wife Ruth Railton in the 1960s and 1970s.

In 2019 a replica was built next to the original by R W Armstrong & Sons Ltd.

References

Buildings and structures on the River Thames
Grade II* listed buildings in the London Borough of Richmond upon Thames
Grade II* listed houses in London
Hampton Court Palace
Middlesex
History of Middlesex
Houses completed in 1701
Houses in the London Borough of Richmond upon Thames
William Talman buildings
Christopher Wren buildings in London
Replica buildings